The shortlisted nominees for the 2014 Governor General's Awards for Literary Merit were announced on October 7, 2014, and the winners were announced on November 18. Each winner was awarded $25,000 from the Canada Council for the Arts.

English

French

References

External links
Governor General's Awards

Governor General's Awards
Governor General's Awards
Governor General's Awards